Kariyilakkattu Pole is a 1986 Indian Malayalam-language mystery thriller film written and directed by P. Padmarajan. It is based on the radio drama Sisirathil Oru Prabhatham by Sudhakar Mangalodayam, the plot follows DySP Achuthankutty who is investigating the murder of a film director, Harikrishnan. The film stars Mammootty, Mohanlal, Rahman, Sripriya, Karthika, Jalaja, and Unni Mary. The background score was composed by Johnson.
A Padmarajan classic, the film is widely considered one of the best investigative thrillers ever made in Malayalam.

Plot
Harikrishnan, a famous movie director, is found dead at his house one morning. Deputy Superintendent of Police Achuthankutty is assigned to probe the death. Anilkumar, his younger brother, is in love with Shilpa, who is in shock after receiving news of the murder. Achuthan Kutty's investigation leads to three different female suspects.

A women's shoe from the murder scene and other shreds of evidence leads Achuthankutty to conclude that a woman was the killer. Achuthankutty finds  Parvathi's (Unni Mary) photograph in Harikrishnan's diary. The investigation leads it to a middle-aged woman, Bhagini Sevamayi, leading the life of a Saint in a Hindu Ashramam. He arrests her as she refuses to answer his questions. Shilpa tries to talk to Achuthankutty because Bhagini is her aunt.

He is told about a relation between Harikrishnan and Shilpa. He is not able to figure out whether the relationship is paternal or romantic. Shilpa breaks down and tells him that Harikrishnan was like an uncle and guide for her, but somehow her mother could not digest their relationship. Achuthankutty then uncovers Harikrishnan's past from Shilpa's mother.

As lecturers in their youth, Harikrishnan was trying to woo her friend.  She tried to stand between them, and  Harikrishnan rapes her. Her dejected friend eventually took up the life of a nun. Shilpa is Harikrishnan's illicit child and she was unhappy with their relationship because she suspected Harikrishnan would abuse his own daughter.  She accepts that she had planned to kill Harikrishnan, but found him dead when she arrived at his house.

Achuthankutty decides to question Shilpa and her mother again, with more brutal methods. His brother Anil unsuccessfully tries to change his mind. Anil finally confesses his love for Shilpa, became jealous of Harikrishnan and killed him. He then commits suicide, leaving a bewildered Achuthankutty staring at his corpse. Achuthankutty burns Anil's suicide note.

Cast
Mammootty as Film director Harikrishnan
Mohanlal as DySP Achuthankutty
Rahman as Anil Kumar, Achuthankutty's brother 
Karthika as Shilpa 
Sripriya as Shilpa's mother
Jalaja as Ragini
Unni Mary as Bhaginisevamayi / Parvathi
Valsala Menon as actress Thulasi's mother
Krishnankutty Nair as watchman Appu Pilla
Prem Prakash as Menon

Production
The film is based on the radio drama Sisirathil Oru Prabhatham written by Sudhakar Mangalodayam and broadcast on Akashavani. His name was credited as Sudhakar P. Nair in the film. The film was first titled Aram (അറം), but later changed to Kariyilakkattu Pole due to superstitious reasons. The title was taken from a short story written by Padmarajan titled "Kariyilakkattu Pole".

References

External links 
 

1986 films
1980s Malayalam-language films
1980s mystery films
Indian films based on plays
Indian mystery thriller films
Films with screenplays by Padmarajan
Films scored by Johnson
Films directed by Padmarajan